Harry Christian VC (17 January 1892 – 2 September 1974) was an English recipient of the Victoria Cross, the highest and most prestigious award for gallantry in the face of the enemy that can be awarded to members of the British and Commonwealth armed forces.

Details
Christian was 23 years old, and a private in the 2nd Battalion, King's Own Royal Regiment (Lancaster), British Army during the First World War when the following deed took place at Cuinchy, France, for which he was awarded the VC.

The citation, published in the London Gazette on 3 March 1916, read:

The Medal
His Victoria Cross is displayed at The King's Own Royal (Lancaster) Regiment Museum in Lancaster, England.

References

 Monuments to Courage (David Harvey, 1999)
 The Register of the Victoria Cross (This England, 1997)
 VCs of the First World War - The Western Front 1915 (Peter F. Batchelor & Christopher Matson, 1999)

External links
 Location of grave and VC medal (Cumbria)
 Royal Lancaster Museum

1892 births
1974 deaths
King's Own Royal Regiment soldiers
British Army personnel of World War I
British World War I recipients of the Victoria Cross
People from Ulverston
British Army recipients of the Victoria Cross
Military personnel from Lancashire